The Pomeranian Evangelical Church (PEK) was a Protestant regional church in the German state of Mecklenburg-Vorpommern, serving the citizens living in Hither Pomerania. The Pomeranian Evangelical Church was based on the teachings brought forward by Martin Luther and other Reformators during the Reformation. It combined Lutheran and Reformed traditions (Prussian Union). The seat of the church was Greifswald, the bishop's preaching venue was the former Collegiate Church of St. Nicholas in Greifswald.

In May 2012, the Pomeranian Evangelical Church merged with the North Elbian Evangelical Lutheran Church and the Evangelical Lutheran Church of Mecklenburg into the Evangelical Lutheran Church in Northern Germany. The Pomeranian Evangelical Church was a full member of the Evangelical Church in Germany (EKD) between 1950 and 1969 and again from 1991 to 2012, and of the Evangelical Church of the Union between 1950 and 2003, and thereafter of the Union of Evangelical Churches. The church was also a member of the Community of Protestant Churches in Europe. Last bishop was Dr. Hans-Jürgen Abromeit since 2006.

History
At the time of the Reformation Pomerania within the Holy Roman Empire (Duchy of Pomerania) consisted of three separate states, the two branch duchies of Pomerania-Stettin (capital: Stettin, renamed as Szczecin as of 1945) and Pomerania-Wolgast (capital: Wolgast) as well as of the secular principality (capital: Kolberg, renamed as Kołobrzeg as of 1945) ruled by the Prince-Bishops of Cammin, who – in Roman Catholic respect – presided over the exempt Roman Catholic Cammin diocese (seat: Cammin, renamed as Kamień Pomorski as of 1945) comprising all the prince-episcopal state, Pomerania-Stettin, parts of eastern Mecklenburg, the New March and much of Pomerania-Wolgast. The latter's island Rügen formed part of the Roman Catholic diocese of Roskilde, converted to Lutheranism by the Danish king in 1537, the northern mainland area of Pomerania-Wolgast formed part of the Diocese of Schwerin.

Reformation and formation of Lutheran state churches
 On 13 December 1534 the Pomeranian Common Diet in Treptow an der Rega voted in favour of the introduction of Lutheranism in the branch duchies, so in the subsequent years most congregations and parishioners in Cammin diocese converted to Lutheranism. Only in Cammin's prince-episcopal state Bishop  could defend the Catholic faith. In 1535 the first Lutheran church order (Kirchenordnung; church constitution) for Pomerania was designed by the famous Pomeranian Reformator Johannes Bugenhagen, also called Doctor Pomeranus, but was only implemented in 1563. In 1535 the two Pomeranian branch duchies, Pomerania-Wolgast and Pomerania-Stettin, each appointed its own spiritual leader (called general superintendent as of 1563), seated in Greifswald for Pomerania-Wolgast and in Stettin for western Pomerania-Stettin, and, however, subordinate to Stettin, in Stolp (renamed as Słupsk) as of 1945) with subsidiary competence for the eastern part of Pomerania-Stettin.

In 1544 the Cammin diocesan cathedral chapter elected  as successor of Manteuffel, becoming the first Lutheran on the Cammin see, however, not confirmed by the Holy See. Suawe then introduced Lutheranism in the prince-episcopal state. His competence as spiritual Lutheran leader, however, was restricted to the prince-episcopal state (Hochstift), everywhere else in the former Cammin diocesan ambit superintendents, appointed by the respective ducal rulers, had taken Lutheran leadership. Protestantism had since been the prevailing Christian denomination in all of ducal and episcopal Pomerania.

The Lutheran churches in the three states of ducal and prince-episcopal Pomerania ranked as state churches. Temporary partitions without share in the Pomeranian governments, such as Pomerania-Barth (1569–1605; ecclesiastically under the general superintendent in Greifswald) and Pomerania-Rügenwalde (1569–1620; ecclesiastically under the superintendent in Stolp till 1604, then Stettin), had no effect on the structure of the two ducal state churches. The Administrators of Cammin prince-bishopric, elected in 1557 and later, lacked theological skills and did not serve as spiritual leaders of the prince-episcopal Lutheran state church any more, but superintendents (Stiftssuperintendenten; i.e. superintendent of the Hochstift) were appointed since 1558. In the same year the Cammin prince-bishopric also established a Lutheran consistory of its own. In 1556 Pomerania-Wolgast had established its own consistory. Its ambit comprised Pomerania north of the river Randow and west of the rivers Swine and Oder. Between 1575 and 1815 Stralsund, a city in Pomerania-Wolgast, maintained an own consistory for the Lutheran congregations within the city boundary.

During the Thirty Years' War (1618–1648) Pomerania fell under Swedish occupation. In 1625 the Wolgast ducal branch was extinct in the male line and bequeathed to Stettin. With the extinction of the Stettin line too in 1637 the electors of Brandenburg inherited Pomerania, however, inhibited by the Swedish occupants. In 1653, after quarrels and negotiations Sweden and Brandenburg partitioned ducal Pomerania into Swedish Pomerania (comprising former Pomerania-Wolgast and the west of former Pomerania-Stettin), and Brandenburgian Pomerania (comprising the former Cammin prince-bishopric and central and eastern parts of former Pomerania-Stettin).

 As to the Lutheran state church of Swedish (Hither) Pomerania it took over the Wolgast-Pomeranian ecclesiastical institutions in Greifswald (consistory and general superintendency), whereas consistory and general superintendency in Stettin were closed down. The Pomeranian and Cammin spiritual Consistory, established as Cammin Consistory in 1558 in Cammin's capital Kolberg, was seated in that city (1558–1668, and again 1683–1686), in Stargard in Pomerania (1668–1683, and again 1686–1738) and afterwards in Stettin. With the Edict of Potsdam (1685) Huguenots founded Calvinist congregations in Stargard (1687), Stolp and Kolberg (1699). Swedish Pomerania did not allow the immigration of Calvinists.

After in 1713 Swedish Pomerania had ceded Stettin, in 1721 Calvinists founded a congregation there too. With the repeated cessions of Swedish Pomeranian territory to Brandenburgian Pomerania in the early 18th century also the ambit of the general superintendency in Greifswald shrank in favour of that for western Brandenburgian Pomerania. In 1738 the Pomeranian and Cammin spiritual Consistory moved to Stettin, however, due to the distance to remote eastern Farther Pomerania (the Hinterkreise; i.e. farther districts) it opened a subsidiary consistory for the east, the Farther Pomeranian Consistory of Köslin (aka ) in 1747. In 1750 the new Superior Consistory in Berlin (Lutherisches Oberconsistorium zu Berlin) became the superior authority for all Lutheran church bodies in Brandenburg-Prussia. The few Reformed (or Calvinist) congregations in Pomerania became subject to the Reformed Church Directorate in Berlin (Reformierte Kirchen-Direction).

Ecclesiastical Province of Pomerania within the Prussian Union of churches
In 1815 Swedish Pomerania became a pawn in the hands of the powerful, Sweden ceded it to Denmark which passed it on to Prussia in exchange for Saxe-Lauenburg. Swedish Pomerania was renamed as New Hither Pomerania (Neuvorpommern). In 1817 the supreme governor of the Lutheran State Church and the Reformed State Church in Prussia, Frederick William III, initiated the merger of both churches to form the Evangelical Church in Prussia, avoiding in its name the terms Lutheran or Reformed. This new state church, an administratively united umbrella comprising Lutheran, Reformed (Calvinist) and United Protestant congregations, built up regional subdivisions, so-called ecclesiastical provinces (Kirchenprovinzen).

Its Ecclesiastical Province of Pomerania, comprising congregations within the borders of the Province of Pomerania, consisted of the Lutheran congregations within the state church of former Swedish Pomerania, of the Lutheran congregations previously subject to the Stettin general superintendent under the Lutheran Superior Consistory in Berlin, and of the Reformed (Calvinist) congregations located in Pomerania and previously subject to the Reformed Church Directorate in Berlin.

The King originally intended the merger of locally established Lutheran and Calvinist congregations into congregations of a United Protestant confession, and the adoption of the Union confession by all local congregations without an existing local partner of the other confession to merge with. His intention, however, failed due to strong Lutheran resistance throughout his monarchy, especially among Lutherans in Pomerania and Silesia.

This fight even caused the schism of the Old Lutherans. A number of Lutheran congregations refrained to join the new umbrella or seceded from it in the 1820s and 1830s, forming the independent Evangelical Lutheran Church in Prussia recognised in 1845, which was why the Evangelical Church in Prussia renamed as Evangelical State Church in Prussia (Evangelische Landeskirche in Preußen), indicating its privileged status. So finally the merger, not including all congregations, materialised as a mere administrative Union, including in Pomerania mostly Lutheran congregations, the traditionally prevailing denomination, and some few Reformed and United Protestant congregations.

Reformed congregations were usually found in cities or newly established or resettled villages in formerly Brandenburgian Pomerania, where Calvinist immigrants ensconced after 1685. United Protestant congregations usually emerged in cities, where Calvinists and Lutherans lived side by side and disliked the denominational split.

The ecclesiastical province had its headquarters, the 1815-founded Royal [or Evangelical (as of 1918)]  and general superintendent, domiciling in Stettin, taken over from the Brandenburgian Pomeranian Lutheran Church, the latter's local Köslin Consistory had been dissolved in 1815. The Swedish Pomeranian former Greifswald Consistory and the local  were stripped of their competences and dissolved in 1849 and 1815, respectively, the general superintendency in Greifswald was not restaffed after 1824. Since initially the office of general superintendent was not provided as a function in the new Evangelical Church in Prussia at all, the respective offices had not been restaffed when their previous incumbents retired, causing a vacancy. However, since the late 1820s the Evangelical Church in Prussia appointed general superintendents in all its ecclesiastical provinces.

Bismarck's church reforms strengthened the autonomy and self-rule of the state church, which in 1875 renamed as Evangelical State Church of Prussia's older Provinces (Evangelische Landeskirche der älteren Provinzen Preußens), since in Prussian provinces annexed since 1866 their regional Protestant church bodies had remained independent of the Evangelical State Church of Prussia. The reform laws strengthened the parishioners' participation through elected presbyteries and provincial synods in matters of the Ecclesiastical Province of Pomerania. In 1892 the Consistory of Pomerania Province moved into its new building on Elisabethstraße (today's ulica Kaszubska in Szczecin). With the end of the  the church lost its status as state church and assumed independence. With its new church order and name, Evangelical Church of the old-Prussian Union (as of 1922, Evangelische Kirche der altpreußischen Union; APU), it accounted for these changes.

The parishioners in the congregations elected synodals for their respective provincial synod – the legislative body – which again elected its governing board the provincial church council (Provinzialkirchenrat), which also included members delegated by the Evangelical Consistory of Pomerania Province. The consistory was the provincial administrative body, whose members were appointed by the Evangelical Supreme Church Council in Berlin, the central administrative body of the old-Prussian Union church. The consistory was chaired by the Stettin general superintendent, being the ecclesiastical, and a consistorial president (German: Konsistorialpräsident), being the administrative leader. In 1921 the Ecclesiastical Province of Pomerania was divided into two general superintendencies (Westsprengel and Ostsprengel), the western ambit seated again in Greifswald, the eastern ambit in Stettin. The provincial synods and the provincial church councils elected from their midst the Pomeranian synodals for the general synod, the legislative body of the overall Evangelical Church of the old-Prussian Union. In 1927 the general synod of the old-Prussian Union church legislated in favour of the ordination of women.

With the Nazi-imposed premature reelection of presbyteries and synods within the old-Prussian church in July 1933 the Nazi-submissive Protestant movement of German Christians gained majorities in most Pomeranian presbyteries and the Pomeranian provincial synod, like in most old-Prussian ecclesiastical provinces. In June 1933 the Nazi government of Prussia, ignoring religious autonomy, furloughed the then incumbent general superintendent  (western district, seated in Greifswald), whereas his colleague  (eastern district, seated in Stettin) retired in October the same year. This allowed the German Christians, dominating the provincial synod, to install their proponent  as provincial bishop (Provinzialbischof), combining the ambits of Westsprengel and Ostsprengel, self-aggrandising as Bishop of Cammin, claiming Führerprinzip-like authority over all the provincial clergy.

Especially among the many Pomeranian rural Pietists the opposition, forming the Confessing Church movement, found considerable support. The provincial ecclesiastical committee provided for the ignoration of Thom, so that the constitutional two general superintendencies could be restaffed. In 1941, following the incorporation of Posen-West Prussia into Pomerania (1938), also the Ecclesiastical Province of Posen-West Prussia was dissolved and its ambit became a part of the Ecclesiastical Province of Pomerania. In 1941 about two million of the Pomeranians, then amounting to 2.394 million inhabitants, were parishioners of the Pomeranian ecclesiastical province.

On 22 December 1941 the official new umbrella, the pan-German Evangelical Church, called for suited actions by all Protestant church bodies to withhold baptised non-Aryans from all spheres of Protestant church life. Many German Christian-dominated congregations followed suit, whereas confessing congregations in the Ecclesiastical Province of Pomerania dared to hand in lists of signatures in protest against the exclusion of the stigmatised Protestants of Jewish descent.

By the East Pomeranian Offensive, February–April 1945, the Red Army advanced so speedily, that there was hardly a chance to rescue refugees, let alone archives of congregations in Farther Pomerania, as was recorded in a report about the situation in the ecclesiastical provinces (10 March 1945). By the end of the war hundred thousands of parishioners and hundreds of pastors were fleeing westwards. The Ecclesiastical Province of Pomerania tried to relocate its Stettin-based institutions, the consistory, general superintendency, and pertaining offices, to Greifswald. Between April and July 1945 the Soviets handed over all of Pomerania on both banks along the Oder and east thereof to Poland. Thus the east district (Ostsprengel) dropped into dissolution. With the simultaneous atrocities against and expulsion of the remaining Pomeranians and the systematic suppression of any kind of their organisations and associations the church life in Polish-annexed Pomerania came to an end. Chattel, such as archives and files of the ecclesiastical province and the congregations, could only be partially rescued to places in the west ambit. In August 1945 the three Allies of Potsdam approved these facts and agreed to house and feed the destitute Pomeranians expelled to their zones of occupation.

On the occasion of the first meeting of representatives of Germany's persisting Protestant church bodies in Treysa (a part of today's Schwalmstadt) on 31 August 1945, the representatives of the six surviving old-Prussian ecclesiastical provinces (March of Brandenburg, Pomerania, Rhineland, Saxony, Silesia, and Westphalia) and the central Evangelical Supreme Church Council took fundamental decisions about the future of the Evangelical Church of the old-Prussian Union. They decided to assume the independent existence of each ecclesiastical province as Landeskirche (Protestant regional church body) and to reform the Evangelical Church of the old-Prussian Union into a mere umbrella organisation ("Neuordnung der Evangelischen Kirche der altpreußischen Union"). In Treysa the representatives of all Protestant church bodies from Germany founded a new umbrella, the Evangelical Church in Germany (EKD).

Most of the parishioners remaining in Polish-annexed Pomerania Province were expelled by Poland in the post-war period of expulsion of Germans between 1945 and 1948. With most of the territory, formerly comprised by the eastern ambit (Ostsprengel) of the Ecclesiastical Province of Pomerania, transferred to Poland, it expropriated all church property there, parochial and provincial alike, without compensation, with the church buildings mostly taken over by the Roman Catholic Church, and most Protestant cemeteries desecrated and devastated. The provincial church institutions were built up anew in Greifswald, while the Soviets handed over Stettin, the former seat, to Poland in July 1945.

The majority of the 1.5 million fled and expelled Pomeranian parishioners found refuge outside of the remaining territory of the Ecclesiastical Province of Pomerania and thus joined congregations within other Protestant regional church bodies, about 70,000 parishioners perished through war, flight and expulsion. But many stranded also in the west ambit (Westsprengel) with its original 500,000 inhabitants. The situation turned severe with a massive shortage of food and lodgement. However, since the Soviets had decided to keep most of Hither Pomerania, which included the Westsprengel, as part of their occupation zone refugees from Hither Pomerania, fled from there from March to May 1945, could return afterwards and congregational and provincial ecclesiastical structures were rebuilt. However, the position of general superintendent remained vacant after 1945. In October 1946 the 20th Pomeranian provincial synod elected Scheven general superintendent, and allowed him to adopt the new title of bishop.

Pomeranian Evangelical Church

The 20th Pomeranian provincial synod, 9–11 October 1946, had also decided to develop a new church order in order to reconstitute the Ecclesiastical Province of Pomerania as an independent regional Protestant church body. On 2 June 1950 the Pomeranian provincial synod adopted the prepared new church order and thus established the Pomeranian Evangelical Church, territorially comprising those parts of the former ecclesiastical province located in then East Germany (German Democratic Republic, GDR). By its new constitution its spiritual leader, titled bishop since late 1946, would continue to use that title. The Pomeranian Evangelical Church became a full member of the Evangelical Church in Germany and between 1950 and 2003 was a full member of the Evangelical Church of the old-Prussian Union, now a mere umbrella. Under communist pressure the Evangelical Church of the old-Prussian Union had to skip the term Prussian from its name and renamed as Evangelical Church of the Union (Evangelische Kirche der Union; EKU) on its general synod in December 1953. In 1956 the Pomeranian church counted 720,000 parishioners, about one third of them with refugee background.

Evangelical Church in Greifswald
Following the second constitution of the GDR, enacted on April 9, 1968, and accounting for its de facto transformation into a communist dictatorship, the Council of Ministers of the GDR demoted all church bodies from statutory "Public-law Corporations" to mere "Civil Associations". Thus the council could force the Pomeranian Evangelical Church to remove the term Pomerania from its name, because East German propaganda silenced about all terms recalling former German territory annexed by Poland or the Soviet Union. The church body then chose the new name Evangelical Church in Greifswald.

Along with the status as "Public-law Corporation" the new GDR constitution did away with the church tax, automatically collecting parishioners' contributions as a surcharge on the income tax. Now parishioners had to fix the level of their contributions and to transfer them again and again on their own. This together with ongoing discrimination of church members, which let many secede from the church, effectively eroded the adherence of parishioners and the financial situation of the Evangelical Church in Greifswald.

Pomeranian Evangelical Church from 1990 to 2012
In 1990, after the end of the GDR dictatorship, the church body returned to its former name. With the dissolution of the GDR-Federation of Protestant Churches in 1991 the Pomeranian Evangelical Church reentered the EKD and remained its member until the merger in 2012. The blessing of same-sex unions was allowed. The number of parishioners continued to sink and reached 140,000 in 1997, somewhat more than 20% of the Hither Pomeranian population. On 28 March 2009 the synod voted in the merger with the two Lutheran church bodies of Mecklenburg and North Elbia, by 44 out of 58 synodals. The merger took effect on Pentecost, 27 May 2012.

Number of parishioners

Governors, governing bodies and chairpersons of the church
Historically the church was subdivided into districts (later called Sprengel in German), partially due to different secular rulers reigning different parts of Pomerania, or partially due to the mere extension of the territory. Thus originally these districts territorially resembled the political subdivisions of Pomerania at the time. Each ecclesiastical district had a consistory and a spiritual leader (usually called general superintendent). At times there were additional subordinate consistories and spiritual leaders with regional competence.

Supreme governors (1534–1918)
Between 1534 and 1918 the incumbents of the different Pomeranian thrones were simultaneously Supreme Governors (summus episcopus) of the State Church, like the English monarch as Supreme Governor of the Church of England. Since 1532 the ducal House of Griffins was divided into two lines, ruling in partitioned parts of the duchy (Pomerania-Stettin 1532–1637; Pomerania-Wolgast 1532–1620). Furthermore, the third political unit was the Prince-Bishopric of Cammin (1248–1650), a prince-bishopric in parts of Farther Pomerania, ruled by Catholic and later Lutheran bishops of Cammin or by administrators elected by its governing body, the collegial cathedral chapter of Cammin, since the Reformation mostly staffed with Lutheran capitular canons.

Two dependent branch duchies, Pomerania-Barth (1569–1605) and Pomerania-Rügenwalde (1569–1620) were without share in the government, thus also without competence as to the Lutheran state churches. After the extinction of the Griffins in 1637 Pomerania was divided into a Swedish and a Brandenburgian part, where the monarchs of Sweden and the Berlin-based Hohenzollern rulers, respectively, then wielded the summepiscopacy.

Ecclesiastical Province of Pomerania (1826–1918)

Spiritual leaders (1535–2012)

In Stettin (1826–1921)

In Greifswald (1921–2012) and in Stettin (1921–1945)

Notes

External links

 https://web.archive.org/web/20110518075042/http://www.pevk.de/ Pomeranian Evangelical Church
 http://www.ekd.de Evangelical Church in Germany

United and uniting churches
Organisations based in Mecklenburg-Western Pomerania
Former member churches of the Evangelical Church in Germany
Religious organizations disestablished in 2012
2012 disestablishments in Germany
1534 establishments in the Holy Roman Empire
History of Lutheranism in Germany
History of Protestantism in Poland
Evangelical